is the 5th major single by the Japanese girl idol group Shiritsu Ebisu Chugaku. It is to be released in Japan on November 20, 2013 by Defstar Records.

Release details 
The single will be released in three versions: Limited Edition A, Limited Edition B, and Subculture Edition (Regular Edition).

Track listing

Limited Alpha Edition

Limited Beta Edition

Subculture Edition (Regular Edition)

Charts

References

External links 
 Reviews
 Review: Shiritsu Ebisu Chugaku "Mikakunin Chūgakusei X" - Rolling Stone Japan
 Discography - Singles - Shiritsu Ebisu Shugaku official site

Shiritsu Ebisu Chugaku songs
2013 singles
Japanese-language songs
Defstar Records singles